Joseph Jehosephat Harpur (1810 – 2 May 1878) was an Australian politician.

Harpur was born in 1810 in the Hunter River district of New South Wales, to Joseph Harpur and Sarah née Chidley. His father was originally from Kinsale, County Cork, Ireland, and was parish clerk and master of the Windsor district school while his mother was from Somerset. Both had been transported. One of his brothers was the poet Charles Harpur.

He was a public servant and clerk, and active in radical and temperance movements. In 1861 he was elected to the New South Wales Legislative Assembly for Patrick's Plains at a by-election, but he did not re-contest in 1864.

References

 

1810 births
1878 deaths
Members of the New South Wales Legislative Assembly
19th-century Australian politicians